Hontianske Nemce is a village and municipality in the Krupina District of the Banská Bystrica Region of Slovakia.

Notable people 
 Marián Labuda, Slovak actor
 Gustáv Valach, Slovak actor

Genealogical resources

The records for genealogical research are available at the state archive "Statny Archiv in Banska Bystrica, Slovakia"

 Lutheran church records (births/marriages/deaths): 1786-1895 (parish B)

See also
 List of municipalities and towns in Slovakia

References

External links
 
 
 Surnames of living people in Hontianske Nemce

Villages and municipalities in Krupina District